The INTA-255 was a Spanish sounding rocket.

The INTA-255 was launched with 4 Chick rockets, which start with 0.2 seconds long burned. The INTA-255 was started three times 1969/70. The ceiling of the INTA-255 amounted to 150 km, the takeoff thrust 42.00 kN, the star mass 340 kg, the diameter 0.26 m and the length of 6,03 m.

See also 
INTA-300

References

Sounding rockets of Spain
Space launch vehicles of Spain
Spaceflight
Instituto Nacional de Técnica Aeroespacial